Van Beirendonck is a Belgian surname. Notable people with the surname include:

Lou Van Beirendonck (born 1960), Belgium Professor HRM at Antwerp Management School
Walter Van Beirendonck (born 1957), Belgian fashion designer

Surnames of Dutch origin